Sagitta is a constellation, named after the Latin word for arrow. 

Sagitta may also refer to:

 Sagitta (arrowworm), a genus of chaetognaths in the class Sagittoidea 
 Sagitta (geometry), the depth of an arc
 Sagitta (optics), a measure of the glass removed to yield an optical curve
 Ligularia sagitta, a plant species
 Sagitta, one of the otoliths, a structure in the inner ear of some fish
 N.V. Vliegtuigbouw 013 Sagitta, a Dutch-designed glider that first flew in 1960
 USNS Sagitta (T-AK-87) (1944–1959)
 Versine, a trigonometric function
 Sagitta, pseudonym of Scottish-German author John Henry Mackay (1864–1993)

See also
 
 Sagittal, in mathematics
 Sagittaria. a genus of aquatic plants
 Sagittarius (disambiguation)
 Sagit (disambiguation)